Kildonan Place is a shopping centre in Winnipeg, Manitoba, Canada, located in the neighbourhood of Transcona at 1555 Regent Avenue West.

The mall has 119 stores and services, a 6-screen theatre, and food court. It has  of gross leaseable area.

History 
Kildonan Place opened on September 24, 1980, with anchors Sears, Hudson's Bay, and Dominion Foods.

At the opening, the Hudson's Bay store was the largest single-floor Bay store in Canada.

An additional . of large format stores and in-line stores is planned. In spring 2013, the location of the former Zellers store (closed in November 2012) opened as one of the first Target stores in the city.

In October 2016, crews started demolishing the inside of the former Target store and converting it into smaller sections. The new stores will be accessed from inside the mall, with HomeSense taking up 21,000 square feet and Marshalls at 24,000 square feet. Up to 11 new stores will be joining the mall starting with a mid-may opening followed by a second grand opening event later in summer of 2017.

The addition will include HomeSense, Marshalls, H&M, Urban Planet, Hakim Optical, Skechers, CAA & HUB Insurance. In addition, Mastermind Toys, Qdoba, Coal Fired by Carbone, and Almond Nail Bar will be added as free standing units.

In June 2019, it was announced that a new , six-screen Cineplex Cinemas location would be built in a portion of the former Sears space, replacing the existing Famous Players cinema. It was originally expected to open in late-2021. In November 2019, Cineplex announced that the location would be part of a new Cineplex banner known as Junxion, which will feature a family entertainment centre concept combined with a cinema.

In April 2021, Save-On-Foods opened a grocery store in another portion of the former Sears space.

Anchors 
 Marshalls / HomeSense
 Famous Players Theatres
 Shoppers Drug Mart
 Save-On-Foods

Former anchors 
 Target, 
 Hudson's Bay, 120,000 sq ft - closed March 25, 2000
 Zellers, 123,256 sq ft 
Dominion Foods, 35,000 sq ft
 Sears,  - Last remaining Sears in Winnipeg along with St Vital, closed January 8, 2018.

References

External links 

 
 Primaris Website

Buildings and structures in Winnipeg
Shopping malls in Manitoba
Shopping malls established in 1980
Transcona, Winnipeg
Kildonan, Winnipeg